El Hamool or  is one of the largest cities in the Kafr El Sheikh Governorate, in the north of Egypt. It is located in the northern part of the Governorate.

Name
The name, El Hamool, comes from the name of a plant known locally as "el hamool" which is usually planted in Lake Burullus near Baltim.

See also

 List of cities and towns in Egypt

References

Populated places in Kafr El Sheikh Governorate